The Vancouver Board of Parks and Recreation, commonly referred to as the Vancouver Park Board, is the elected board with exclusive possession, jurisdiction and control over public parks in Vancouver, British Columbia, Canada. Established by section 485 of the Vancouver Charter, the Vancouver Park Board is the only elected body of its kind in Canada. It has seven elected commissioners who are charged by the Vancouver Charter with determining the policy direction of the Park Board. The board has a mandate to "provide, preserve and advocate… to benefit people, communities and the environment". Commissioners are elected at-large every four years, with a chair and vice-chair elected by the commissioners every year.

Members

Since 2022

2018–2022

The commissioners of the Vancouver Park Board elected at the 2018 Vancouver municipal election served until November 6, 2022.

2014–2018

The commissioners of the Vancouver Park Board elected during the 2014 Vancouver municipal election served until late 2018.

Independence 
In June 2009, Vancouver mayor Gregor Robertson and Vancouver city councillor Raymond Louie, both of whom were members of the Vision Vancouver party, were accused by Vancouver city councillor Suzanne Anton, a member of the opposition Non-Partisan Association party, of attempting to destroy the independence of the park board by centralizing budget oversight. Aaron Jasper, a Vision Vancouver member of the park board, called on the city council to restore the decentralized budget control. 

In September 2009, Susan Mundick, the general manager of the board, announced her retirement. Penny Ballem, the city manager of Vancouver hired by Robertson, stripped Mundick of all routine transitional duties. Ballem then stated she would help the park board choose Mundick's replacement, a selection process city hall traditionally had not been involved in. In response, Anton urged Robertson and the city council to limit Ballem's control of the park board.

Parks
The Vancouver Park Board oversees more than 200 parks, including major attractions such as Stanley Park to local neighbourhood parks such as Falaise Park.

Notes

References

External links
Vancouver Board of Parks and Recreation

Municipal government of Vancouver